The Caucasus Viceroyalty was established in 1785 by Catherine the Great by transforming Astrakhan Governorate and adding some lands from Taurida Oblast. It was abolished by Paul I in 1796.

Viceroys
The five viceroys or heads of the viceroyalty were:

Viceroyalty (1785–96)
Viceroyalties of the Russian Empire
History of the North Caucasus
1780s in the Russian Empire
1790s in the Russian Empire
18th century in Georgia (country)
1785 establishments in the Russian Empire
1796 disestablishments in the Russian Empire
1785 establishments in Asia
1796 disestablishments in Asia
1785 establishments in Europe
1796 disestablishments in Europe